Sami Mustonen (born 6 April 1977) is a Finnish freestyle skier and Olympic medallist, who was born in Kemijärvi. He received a bronze medal at the 1998 Winter Olympics in Nagano, in moguls.

References

External links

1977 births
Living people
People from Kemijärvi
Finnish male freestyle skiers
Freestyle skiers at the 1998 Winter Olympics
Freestyle skiers at the 2002 Winter Olympics
Freestyle skiers at the 2006 Winter Olympics
Olympic bronze medalists for Finland
Olympic freestyle skiers of Finland
Olympic medalists in freestyle skiing
Medalists at the 1998 Winter Olympics
Sportspeople from Lapland (Finland)